Ana Maria Berbece (born 23 July 1999) is a Romanian handballer for Corona Brașov.

International honours 
EHF Cup:
Semifinalist: 2016

Personal life
She is the daughter of Dumitru Berbece.

References

 

1999 births
Living people
Romanian female handball players
Sportspeople from Brașov